Diplommatina is a genus of land snails with an operculum, terrestrial gastropod mollusks in the family Diplommatinidae.

This genus includes hundreds of described species and several subgenera. Species in this genus are mainly from southern Asia.

Species
Species within the genus Diplommatina include:

 Diplommatina abbreviata Heude, 1885
 Diplommatina abiesiana Budha & Naggs, 2017
 Diplommatina acme Laidlaw, 1949
 Diplommatina aculus Möllendorff, 1894
 Diplommatina adversa (Adam & Adams, 1851)
 Diplommatina aetarum Zilch, 1953
 Diplommatina akirai Chang & Ookubo, 1998
 Diplommatina akron Panha & J. B. Burch, 1998
 Diplommatina alata
 Diplommatina aldrichi Godwin-Austen, 1890
 Diplommatina ampla Pilsbry, 1902
 Diplommatina amurensis Mousson, 1887
 Diplommatina angulata Stanisic, 2010
 Diplommatina angulifera Bavay & Dautzenberg, 1912
 Diplommatina antheae Vermeulen, 1993
 Diplommatina apicina (Gredler, 1885)
 Diplommatina asynaimos Vermeulen, 1993
 Diplommatina atauroensis Köhler & Kessner, 2020
 Diplommatina attenuata Laidlaw, 1949
 Diplommatina aurea
 Diplommatina auriculata Möllendorff, 1897
 Diplommatina aurisdiaboli Vermeulen, 1993
 Diplommatina austeni Blanford, 1868
 Diplommatina azlani Marzuki, 2019
 Diplommatina balerica Quadras & Möllendorff, 1896
 Diplommatina baliana Fulton, 1899
 Diplommatina baritensis E. A. Smith, 1893
 Diplommatina beccarii Issel, 1874
 Diplommatina beckmanni Maassen, 2007
 Diplommatina belonis Möllendorff, 1900
 Diplommatina bicolor Möllendorff, 1887
 Diplommatina bicoronata Martens, 1884
 Diplommatina bidentata Vermeulen, Liew & Schilthuizen, 2015
 Diplommatina bifissurata Bavay & Dautzenberg, 1912
 Diplommatina blanfordiana Benson, 1860
 Diplommatina boessnecki Walther & Hausdorf, 2020
 Diplommatina boettgeri Möllendorff, 1887
 Diplommatina boholensis Quadras & Möllendorff, 1896
 Diplommatina bonensis Maassen, 2007
 Diplommatina boucheti Maassen, 2007
 Diplommatina breviplica Möllendorff, 1893
 Diplommatina brunonis E. A. Smith, 1895
 Diplommatina burleyi Maassen, 2007
 Diplommatina busanensis Godwin-Austen, 1889
 Diplommatina cacuminulus Vermeulen, 1993
 Diplommatina cagayanica Möllendorff, 1893
 Diplommatina calcarata Möllendorff, 1897
 Diplommatina calvula Vermeulen, 1993
 Diplommatina canaliculata Möllendorff, 1887
 Diplommatina canarica Beddome, 1875
 Diplommatina cebuensis Möllendorff, 1887
 Diplommatina celebensis Maassen, 2007
 Diplommatina centralis Vermeulen, 1993
 Diplommatina chaoi C.-C. Hwang, K.-M. Chang & H.-W. Chang, 2001
 Diplommatina chejuensis O.-K. Kwon & J.-S. Lee, 1991
 Diplommatina chrysostoma E. A. Smith, 1897
 Diplommatina circumstomata Kuroda & Abe, 1980
 Diplommatina clausilioides Bavay & Dautzenberg, 1912
 Diplommatina collarifera Schmacker & Boettger, 1890
 Diplommatina concavospira Möllendorff, 1894
 Diplommatina concinna H. Adams, 1872
 Diplommatina concolor Quadras & Möllendorff, 1893
 Diplommatina conditioria Maassen, 2007
 Diplommatina confusa Heude, 1885
 Diplommatina congener E. A. Smith, 1894
 Diplommatina conica Möllendorff, 1885
 Diplommatina consularis Gredler, 1886
 Diplommatina contracta Möllendorff, 1886
 Diplommatina crassa Pilsbry, 1901
 Diplommatina crassilabris
 Diplommatina crispata Stoliczka, 1871
 Diplommatina cristata Gredler, 1887
 Diplommatina crosseana Godwin-Austen & Nevill, 1879
 Diplommatina crystallodes Quadras & Möllendorff, 1896
 Diplommatina cyclostoma Möllendorff, 1897
 Diplommatina cyrtochilus Quadras & Möllendorff, 1895
 Diplommatina cyrtorhitis Vermeulen, 1993
 Diplommatina dandanensis Kuroda, 1941
 Diplommatina danzyonarium Kuroda, 1973
 Diplommatina decapitata Vermeulen, Luu, Theary & Anker, 2019
 Diplommatina decaryi Bavay & Germain, 1920
 Diplommatina decipiens Zilch, 1953
 Diplommatina decollata van Benthem Jutting, 1958
 Diplommatina demorgani Laidlaw, 1949
 Diplommatina diminuta Möllendorff, 1891
 Diplommatina diplocheilus Benson, 1857
 Diplommatina diploloma Quadras & Möllendorff, 1895
 Diplommatina diplostoma Rensch, 1931
 Diplommatina doichiangdao Panha & J. B. Burch, 1998
 Diplommatina dormitor Pilsbry, 1902
 Diplommatina dumogaensis Maassen, 2007
 Diplommatina duplicilabra van Benthem Jutting, 1948
 Diplommatina electa Fulton, 1905
 Diplommatina elegans Möllendorff, 1890
 Diplommatina elegantissima Quadras & Möllendorff, 1895
 Diplommatina elisabethae Möllendorff, 1887
 Diplommatina everetti E. A. Smith, 1893
 Diplommatina evexa Vermeulen, 1993
 Diplommatina excentrica E. A. Smith, 1893
 Diplommatina exilis W. T. Blanford, 1863
 Diplommatina exserta Godwin-Austen, 1886
 Diplommatina ferrumequinum Vermeulen, 1993
 Diplommatina filicostata Möllendorff, 1893
 Diplommatina fistulata Budha & Naggs, 2017
 Diplommatina floresiana E. A. Smith, 1897
 Diplommatina floris B. Rensch, 1931
 Diplommatina fluminis B. Rensch, 1931
 Diplommatina folliculus (L. Pfeiffer, 1846)
 Diplommatina fulva Möllendorff, 1901
 Diplommatina futilis Gredler, 1887
 Diplommatina germaini Bavay & Dautzenberg, 1912
 Diplommatina gibbera Pilsbry & Hirase, 1904
 Diplommatina gibberosa Godwin-Austen, 1892
 Diplommatina gibboni
 Diplommatina gibbosa Blanford, 1868
 Diplommatina godawariensis Budha & Naggs, 2017
 Diplommatina godwini Möllendorff, 1898
 Diplommatina goliath Vermeulen, 1996
 Diplommatina gomantongensis E. A. Smith, 1894
 Diplommatina goniocampta Quadras & Möllendorff, 1895
 Diplommatina gonostoma Möllendorff, 1894
 Diplommatina gotoensis Pilsbry & Hirase, 1908
 Diplommatina gracilis Beddome, 1875
 Diplommatina halimunensis Nurinsiyah & Hausdorf, 2017
 Diplommatina heryantoi Nurinsiyah & Hausdorf, 2017
 Diplommatina herziana Möllendorff, 1886
 Diplommatina heteroglypha van Benthem Jutting, 1948
 Diplommatina heteropleura Vermeulen & Khalik, 2021
 Diplommatina hidaensis Ogaito & Ieyama, 1997
 Diplommatina hidagai Panha, 1998
 Diplommatina huangi Ueng & Wang, 2005
 Diplommatina hungerfordiana Nevill, 1881
 Diplommatina hypipamee Stanisic, 2010
 Diplommatina immersidens Pilsbry & Hirase, 1904
 Diplommatina inermis Gredler, 1887
 Diplommatina inferocuspis J.-C. Lee & W.-L. Wu, 2005
 Diplommatina inflatula
 Diplommatina insularis Tongkerd & Panha, 2013
 Diplommatina insularum Pilsbry, 1901
 Diplommatina intermedia Heude, 1890
 Diplommatina inthanon Panha & J. B. Burch, 2001
 Diplommatina irregularis Möllendorff, 1887
 Diplommatina isolata Maassen, 2007
 Diplommatina isseli Godwin-Austen, 1889
 Diplommatina javana Möllendorff, 1897
 Diplommatina jirasaki Panha, Kanchanasaka & J. B. Burch, 2002
 Diplommatina jonabletti Greķe, 2017
 Diplommatina kakenca Nurinsiyah & Hausdorf, 2017
 Diplommatina karenkoensis Kuroda, 1941
 Diplommatina kewlom Panha & J. B. Burch, 1998
 Diplommatina kiiensis Pilsbry, 1902
 Diplommatina kittelorum Maassen, 2007
 Diplommatina kobelti Pilsbry, 1901
 Diplommatina krabiensis Panha & J. B. Burch, 1998
 Diplommatina kumejimana Pilsbry & Hirase, 1904
 Diplommatina kyobuntoensis Kuroda & Miyanaga, 1943
 Diplommatina kyushuensis Pilsbry & Hirase, 1904
 Diplommatina labiosa Blanford, 1868
 Diplommatina lacrimans Vermeulen, 1993
 Diplommatina laevis Fulton, 1899
 Diplommatina laidlawi Sykes, 1903
 Diplommatina lamellata
 Diplommatina lateralis Pilsbry & Hirase, 1904
 Diplommatina latilabris Kobelt, 1886
 Diplommatina lemyrei Bavay & Dautzenberg, 1904
 Diplommatina lenggongensis Tomlin, 1941
 Diplommatina leptospira Möllendorff, 1897
 Diplommatina leucopsis van Benthem Jutting, 1958
 Diplommatina leytensis Möllendorff, 1893
 Diplommatina ligopleuris Blanford, 1868
 Diplommatina lombockensis E. A. Smith, 1898
 Diplommatina lourinae Poppe, Tagaro & Sarino, 2015
 Diplommatina luchuana Pilsbry, 1901
 Diplommatina lucifuga van Benthem Jutting, 1958
 Diplommatina luodianensis T.-C. Luo, D.-N. Chen & W.-C. Zhou, 2008
 Diplommatina lutea
 Diplommatina lygipleura Vermeulen, 1993
 Diplommatina lyrata (Gould, 1859)
 Diplommatina madaiensis Vermeulen, 1993
 Diplommatina maduana Laidlaw, 1949
 Diplommatina maedai Kuroda, 1941
 Diplommatina maibrat Greķe, 2017
 Diplommatina maipokhariensis Budha & Naggs, 2017
 Diplommatina majapahit Greķe, 2019
 Diplommatina masarangensis P. Sarasin & F. Sarasin, 1899
 Diplommatina masbatica Quadras & Möllendorff, 1895
 Diplommatina megaloptyx Möllendorff, 1894
 Diplommatina meijaardi Vermeulen, 1996
 Diplommatina meratusensis Vermeulen, 1993
 Diplommatina mertoni C. R. Boettger, 1922
 Diplommatina messageri Ancey, 1904
 Diplommatina micropleuris Möllendorff, 1893
 Diplommatina microstoma Möllendorff, 1887
 Diplommatina mindanavica Quadras & Möllendorff, 1895
 Diplommatina miraculumdei Vermeulen, 1993
 Diplommatina miriensis Godwin-Austen, 1917
 Diplommatina moluccensis Greķe, 2017
 Diplommatina moluensis E. A. Smith, 1893
 Diplommatina mongondowensis Maassen, 2007
 Diplommatina munipurensis Godwin-Austen, 1892
 Diplommatina naiyanetri Panha, 1997
 Diplommatina nakashimai Minato, 2015
 Diplommatina natunensis E. A. Smith, 1894
 Diplommatina nesiotica Pilsbry & Hirase, 1909
 Diplommatina nevilli Crosse, 1879
 Diplommatina ngocngai Thach, 2021
 Diplommatina niahensis Godwin-Austen, 1889
 Diplommatina nimanandhi Panha, Kanchanasaka & J. B. Burch, 2002
 Diplommatina nipponensis Möllendorff, 1885
 Diplommatina nishii Yamamoto & K. Uozumi, 1988
 Diplommatina nodifera Möllendorff, 1891
 Diplommatina obliquestriata Maassen, 2007
 Diplommatina occulodentata Chang & Tada, 1997
 Diplommatina oedogaster Vermeulen, 1993
 Diplommatina onyx Fulton, 1901
 Diplommatina ookuboi Chang & Tada, 1997
 Diplommatina oshimae Pilsbry, 1901
 Diplommatina oviformis Fulton, 1901
 Diplommatina pachycheilus Benson, 1857
 Diplommatina parabates Laidlaw, 1949
 Diplommatina patani Greķe, 2017
 Diplommatina paxillus (Gredler, 1881)
 Diplommatina pentaechma Laidlaw, 1949
 Diplommatina perpusilla Möllendorff, 1897
 Diplommatina pilanensis Chang & Tada, 2003
 Diplommatina pilula Chang & Tada, 1998
 Diplommatina pimelodes Möllendorff, 1890
 Diplommatina planicollis Möllendorff, 1897
 Diplommatina plecta Fulton, 1901
 Diplommatina polypleuris
 Diplommatina pongrati Panha, Kanchanasaka & J. B. Burch, 2002
 Diplommatina prakayangensis Panha, 1998
 Diplommatina prava Pilsbry & Hirase, 1905
 Diplommatina prostoma Möllendorff, 1894
 Diplommatina pseudopolita Maassen, 2007
 Diplommatina pseudopomatias Gredler, 1902
 Diplommatina pseudotayalis Y.-C. Lee & K.-M. Chang, 2004
 Diplommatina pudica Pilsbry, 1902
 Diplommatina pullula Benson, 1859
 Diplommatina pupinella Heude, 1885
 Diplommatina puppensis Blanford, 1863
 Diplommatina pyra Heude, 1885
 Diplommatina pyramis
 Diplommatina radiiformis Preston, 1913
 Diplommatina recta E.A. Smith, 1895
 Diplommatina regularis
 Diplommatina riedeli Maassen, 2007
 Diplommatina ringens
 Diplommatina ristiae Nurinsiyah & Hausdorf, 2017
 Diplommatina roebeleni Möllendorff, 1887
 Diplommatina rotundata Saurin, 1953
 Diplommatina rubellaria Zilch, 1953
 Diplommatina rubicunda (Martens, 1864)
 Diplommatina rubra Godwin-Austen, 1889
 Diplommatina rufa Möllendorff, 1882
 Diplommatina rupicola Möllendorff, 1887
 Diplommatina saginata Pilsbry, 1901
 Diplommatina salgharica Budha & Backeljau, 2017
 Diplommatina samuiana Möllendorff, 1894
 Diplommatina satanomisakiensis Habe, 1953
 Diplommatina scalaria Blanford, 1868
 Diplommatina schadenbergi Möllendorff, 1888
 Diplommatina schmackeriana Yen, 1939
 Diplommatina schmidti Martens, 1908
 Diplommatina sculptilis Möllendorff, 1885
 Diplommatina seimundi Laidlaw, 1949
 Diplommatina semisculpta Blanford, 1868
 Diplommatina septentrionalis Pilsbry, 1901
 Diplommatina serempakensis Vermeulen, 1993
 Diplommatina setchuanensis Heude, 1885
 Diplommatina sherfaiensis Godwin-Austen, 1870
 Diplommatina shikokuensis Kuroda, Abe & Habe, 1961
 Diplommatina shishanensis C.-C. Hwang, K.-M. Chang & Tada, 2009
 Diplommatina shivapuriensis Budha & Backeljau, 2017
 Diplommatina shuitianensis C.-C. Hwang, K.-M. Chang & Tada, 2009
 Diplommatina silanensis Maassen, 2007
 Diplommatina silvicola Godwin-Austen, 1886
 Diplommatina sinistra Tomlin, 1938
 Diplommatina sinulabris Möllendorff, 1902
 Diplommatina siriphumi Panha & J. B. Burch, 2001
 Diplommatina skeati Sykes, 1903
 Diplommatina slapcinskyi Greķe, 2017
 Diplommatina smithi Kobelt & Möllendorff, 1898
 Diplommatina solomonensis
 Diplommatina soror Vermeulen, 1993
 Diplommatina sperata W. T. Blanford, 1862
 Diplommatina spinosa Godwin-Austen, 1889
 Diplommatina stenoacron Vermeulen & Khalik, 2021
 Diplommatina stibara Vermeulen, 1993
 Diplommatina streptophora Laidlaw, 1949
 Diplommatina strongyla Vermeulen, 1993
 Diplommatina subcalcarata Möllendorff, 1894
 Diplommatina subcylindrica Möllendorff, 1882
 Diplommatina subglaber Vermeulen, 1992
 Diplommatina subisensis Vermeulen, 1993
 Diplommatina sulcicollis Möllendorff, 1897
 Diplommatina sulphurea E. A. Smith, 1893
 Diplommatina superba Godwin-Austen & Nevill, 1879
 Diplommatina supralamellata Maassen, 2007
 Diplommatina suratensis Panha & J. B. Burch, 1998
  Diplommatina syabrubesiensis Budha & Backeljau, 2017
 Diplommatina sykesi Fulton, 1901
 Diplommatina symmetrica Hedley, 1891
 Diplommatina tablasensis Hidalgo, 1888
 Diplommatina tadai Chang, 1997
 Diplommatina taiwanica Pilsbry & Hirase, 1905
 Diplommatina tammesboltae Maassen, 2007
 Diplommatina tanegashimae Pilsbry, 1901
 Diplommatina tantilla (Gould, 1859)
 Diplommatina tattakaensis Chang, Tada & Hwang, 1999
 Diplommatina tayalis Kuroda, 1941
 Diplommatina telnovi Greķe, 2017
 Diplommatina tenuilabiata Fulton, 1901
 Diplommatina tetragonostoma Möllendorff, 1897
 Diplommatina theobaldi Godwin-Austen, 1886
 Diplommatina thersites Möllendorff, 1890
 Diplommatina thomsoni Godwin-Austen, 1892
 Diplommatina tiara Vermeulen, 1993
 Diplommatina timorensis Greke, 2017
 Diplommatina tonkiniana Jaeckel, 1950
 Diplommatina torajaensis Maassen, 2007
 Diplommatina toretos Vermeulen, 1993
 Diplommatina torokkuensis Chang & Tada, 2003
 Diplommatina torquilla van Benthem Jutting, 1958
 Diplommatina tosana Pilsbry & Hirase, 1904
 Diplommatina tosanella Pilsbry & Hirase, 1904
 Diplommatina triangulata Yen, 1939
 Diplommatina tuberifera Zilch, 1953
 Diplommatina tumens Fulton, 1899
 Diplommatina tungwangorum J.-C. Lee & K.-M. Chang, 2004
 Diplommatina turris Pilsbry, 1901
 Diplommatina turritella Möllendorff, 1894
 Diplommatina tweediei Laidlaw, 1949
 Diplommatina tylocheilos Vermeulen, Liew & Schilthuizen, 2015
 Diplommatina tyosenica Kuroda & Miyanaga, 1939
 Diplommatina ujiinsularis Minato, 1982
 Diplommatina ultima Pilsbry & Hirase, 1909
 Diplommatina ungulata
 Diplommatina unicrenata Godwin-Austen, 1897
 Diplommatina uozumii Minato, 1976
 Diplommatina uzenensis Pilsbry, 1900
 Diplommatina ventriculus Möllendorff, 1891
 Diplommatina ventriosa Pilsbry & Hirase, 1904
 Diplommatina vermeuleni Maassen, 2007
 Diplommatina waigeoensis Greķe, 2017
 Diplommatina welzeni Vermeulen, 1993
 Diplommatina whiteheadi E.A. Smith, 1898
 Diplommatina yakushimae Pilsbry, 1901
 Diplommatina yonakunijimana Pilsbry & Hirase, 1909

References

 Maassen, W., 2007. Notes on terrestrial molluscs of the island of Sulawesi. The genus Diplommatina (Gastropoda, Caenogastropoda, Diplommatinidae). Basteria 71(4-6): 189-298
 Möllendorff, O.F. von (1885). Materialien zur Fauna von China. Jahrbücher der Deutschen Malakozoologischen Gesellschaft, 12: 349-398, pl. 9-11. Frankfurt am Main.

External links
 Benson W.H. (1849). Characters of Diplommatina, a new genus of terrestrial mollusks belonging to the family of Carychiadae, and of a second species contained in it; also of a new species of Carychium inhabiting the Western Himalaya. Annals and Magazine of Natural History. ser. 2, 4: 193-195
 Iredale, T. (1941). A basic list of the land Mollusca of Papua. The Australian Zoologist. 10(1): 51-94, pls. 3-4

 
Diplommatinidae
Taxa named by William Henry Benson
Taxonomy articles created by Polbot
Gastropod genera